Covasna is a town in Covasna County, Transylvania, Romania.

Covasna may also refer to:
 Covasna County
 Covasna (Jijia), a tributary of the Jijia
 Covasna (Râul Negru), a tributary of the Râul Negru
 Covasna, a village in Costuleni, Iași, Romania

See also
 Cobasna, a town in Moldova controlled by Transnistria